TSU/UH Athletics District is a light rail station in Houston, Texas on the METRORail system. It is served by the Purple Line and is located on Scott Street near Alabama Avenue. The station is named for the University of Houston, Texas Southern University, and the TDECU Stadium. The station serves both universities. 

Robertson Stadium/UH/TSU station opened on May 23, 2015. It was renamed from Robertson Stadium/UH/TSU to TSU/UH Athletics District in August 2017, after Metro received a request from the University of Houston.

The station is proposed as a transfer station for the University Line.

References

METRORail stations
Railway stations in the United States opened in 2015
2015 establishments in Texas
University of Houston
Texas Southern University
Third Ward, Houston
Railway stations in Texas at university and college campuses
Railway stations in Harris County, Texas